The 1953 Washington and Lee Generals football team was an American football team that represented Washington and Lee University during the 1953 college football season as a member of the Southern Conference. In their second year under head coach Carl Wise, the team compiled an overall record of 4–6, with a mark of 2–4 in conference play. In August 1954, the University trustees canceled the Generals' 1954 season after deciding to no longer provide subsidies for intercollegiate athletics.

Schedule

References

Washington and Lee
Washington and Lee Generals football seasons
Washington and Lee Generals football